Close to You is a Filipino film starring John Lloyd Cruz and Bea Alonzo introducing  Sam Milby.
The movie was released on February 15, 2006 under Star Cinema, directed by Cathy Garcia-Molina. The year 2006 ended with 5 Star Cinema films grossing more than  including Close to You itself.

This film was made sponsored by Close-Up, manufactured by Unilever Philippines.

Plot
Manuel and Marian have been best friends since they were kids. They are so close that they know each other's secrets...well, almost. For the last 16 years, Manuel never had the courage to tell Marian how much he loves her.

On the other hand, Marian sees Manuel as no more than her best friend. Marian's greatest love has always been Lance (Sam), a classmate who protected her from bullies back in grade school. Ever since Lance and his family migrated abroad ten years ago, Marian never had the chance to establish contact with him again. The only thing that Marian knows is that Lance has become the lead singer of the new rock band, Orion.

Good fortune smiles on Marian when Orion decides to tour the Philippines. Marian is intent on seeing Lance again, and she brings Manuel with her on a chase that brings them around the Philippines and abroad. Manuel believes that the whole chase is futile because a popular star like Lance will not remember a simple girl like Marian, but Marian does not believe him.

When Lance and Marian finally meet again, sparks fly between them. Manuel now has to decide - will he let his best friend be happy with her Prince Charming, or will he fight for the love that has kept him alive for the last 16 years?

Cast and characters

Main cast
John Lloyd Cruz as Manuel Soriano/Palits/Nuel
Bea Alonzo as Marian Hermosa /Bru

Supporting cast
Tetchie Agbayani as Lance's Mother
Nova Villa as Lola Dading
Melanie Marquez as Nanay
Boboy Garovillo as Tatay
Cacai Bautista as Inday
Joanne Quintas as Cathy
Karel Marquez as VJ
Glaiza de Castro as Lance's Cousin
Anna Marie Gallo as Young Marian

Introducing
Sam Milby as Lance Guerzon
Carine Cabebe as Abby
Reyson Yap as Raffy

Soundtrack
"Close to You"
Performed by Sam Milby
"Closer You and I"
Performed by Gino Padilla
"Friend of Mine"
Performed by Metafour

Trivia
Three months later, Cruz and Alonzo were from the top-rating primetime soap opera Ikaw ang Lahat sa Akin which ended on November 4, 2005 and after three months they both joined another film All About Love which released on May 31 of the same year with the 3rd and last segment "All About Anna".

External links
Close To You official site
 

2006 films
Films directed by Cathy Garcia-Molina
2000s romance films
Star Cinema films
Philippine romance films